The Turkish population refers to the number of ethnic Turkish people in the world. During the Seljuk (1037–1194) and Ottoman (1299–1923) eras, ethnic Turks were settled across the lands conquered by the two empires. In particular, the Turkification of Anatolia (modern Turkey) was the result of the Battle of Manzikert in 1071 and the formation of the Sultanate of Rum. Thereafter, the Ottomans continued Turkish expansion throughout the regions around the Black Sea and the Mediterranean Sea. Consequently, today the Turkish people form a majority in Turkey and Northern Cyprus. There are also significant Turkish minorities who still live in the Balkans, the Caucasus, the Middle East and the Levant, and North Africa.

More recently, the Turkish people have emigrated from their traditional areas of settlement for various reasons, forming a large diaspora. From the mid-twentieth century onwards, unskilled workers from Turkey settled mainly in German  and French speaking countries of Western Europe, in contrast, a "brain drain" of skilled workers from Turkey migrated mostly to North America. Moreover, ethnic Turks from other traditional areas of Turkish settlement have emigrated mostly due to political reasons. For example, the Meskhetian Turks were deported to Central Asia from Georgia in 1944; Turkish Cypriots have emigrated mostly as refugees to the English-speaking world during the Cyprus conflict and its immediate aftermath; Cretan Turks have significant populations in the Arab world as a result of being expelled from Greece; etc..

Traditional areas of Turkish settlement

Turkish majorities

Turkish "communities"

Turkish minorities

Turkish minorities in the Balkans

Turkish minorities in the Caucasus

Turkish minorities in the Levant

Turkish minorities in North Africa

Other Arab countries

Turkish diasporas

Central Asia

Europe
In 2010 Boris Kharkovsky from the Center for Ethnic and Political Science Studies said that there was up to 15 million Turks living in the European Union. According to Dr Araks Pashayan ten million "Euro-Turks" alone were living in Germany, France, the Netherlands and Belgium in 2012. In addition, there are also significant Turkish communities living in Austria, the UK, Switzerland, Italy, Liechtenstein and the Scandinavian countries. 

Turks make up the largest ethnic minority group in Austria, Denmark, Germany and the Netherlands.

North America

Oceania

Other regions

References and notes

Further reading 

.
 .

.
.
.
.
.
.
.

.

.

Turkish communities outside Turkey